Retail therapy is shopping with the primary purpose of improving the buyer's mood or disposition. Often seen in people during periods of depression or stress, it is normally a short-lived habit. Items purchased during periods of retail therapy are sometimes referred to as "comfort buys" (compare comfort food).

The name retail therapy is ironic and semifacetious, acknowledging that shopping hardly qualifies as true therapy in the medical or psychotherapeutic sense. It was first used in the 1980s, with the first reference being this sentence in the Chicago Tribune of Christmas Eve 1986: "We've become a nation measuring out our lives in shopping bags and nursing our psychic ills through retail therapy."

The fact that shopping may provide a short time of comfort (relief from dysphoria), but also imposes costs and is subject to comedown and withdrawal, make it, like opioid use, either a therapy or an addiction, depending on whether each person uses it adaptively or maladaptively. Retail therapy thus exists on a spectrum with shopping addiction (compulsive buying disorder). In 2001, the European Union conducted a study finding that 33% of shoppers surveyed had "high level of addiction to rash or unnecessary consumption". This habit was causing debt problems for many. The same study also found that young Scottish people had the highest susceptibility to binge purchasing. A 2013 survey of 1000 American adults found that slightly more than half had engaged in retail therapy, with the practice being more common among women (63.9% of women and 39.8% of men); women were most likely to buy clothing while men were most likely to buy food. Research from professors at Youngstown State University found similar results (64% of women vs. 40% of men), with relief from anxiety being the most common reason for retail therapy.

Researchers at Melbourne University have advocated its classification as a psychological disorder called oniomania or compulsive shopping disorder.

Window shopping can offer some of the comforts of shopping. The advantage is that many items and many stores can be enjoyed without cost far more than spending would allow. The disadvantage is that one cannot acquire or keep the items.

See also
 Oniomania
 Buyer's remorse

Notes

References
 Observer "Shopping can make you depressed" May 6 2001 Accessed 20 April 2006
 Melbourne Age "Investigating retail therapy" December 5 2004 Accessed 20 April 2006
 CNN "How shopping makes you happy" July 17, 2013 Accessed 11 July 2018
Treatment of mental disorders
Shopping (activity)